Alfonso Trezza Hernández (born 22 June 1999) is a Uruguayan professional footballer who plays as a winger for Nacional.

Career
A youth academy graduate of Nacional, Trezza was part of club's under-20 team which won 2018 U-20 Copa Libertadores. He made his professional debut on 27 August 2020 in a 2–1 league win against Progreso. He scored his first goal on 22 October 2020 in a 2–0 Copa Libertadores win against Alianza Lima.

Career statistics

Honours
Nacional U20
U-20 Copa Libertadores: 2018

Nacional
Uruguayan Primera División: 2020, 2022
Supercopa Uruguaya: 2021

References

External links
 

1999 births
Living people
Uruguayan people of Italian descent
Association football forwards
Uruguayan footballers
Uruguayan Primera División players
Club Nacional de Football players